2004 Malta Open is a darts tournament, which took place in Malta in 2004.

Results

References

2004 in darts
2004 in Maltese sport
Darts in Malta